Maksym Vadymovych Talovyerov (born 28 June 2000) is a Ukrainian professional footballer who plays as a centre-back for LASK on loan from Czech club Slavia Prague.

Career
Born in Nalchik, Russia while his father was playing there, but was raised in Donetsk, Talovyerov is a product of the Shakhtar Donetsk and Arsenal Kyiv youth academies. His first trainer in Shakhtar Donetsk was Vyacheslav Kozlov

He played for FC Olimpik Donetsk in the Ukrainian Premier League Reserves and was never promoted to the senior squad team, and in February 2019 he was signed by the Czech Republic Dynamo České Budějovice.

On 1 February 2023, Talovyerov signed for Austrian Bundesliga club LASK on loan until the end of the season.

Personal life
His father, Vadym Talovyerov, is a retired football defender.

Career statistics

Club

References

External links 
 
 

2000 births
Living people
Footballers from Donetsk
Ukrainian footballers
Ukrainian expatriate footballers
FC Olimpik Donetsk players
SK Dynamo České Budějovice players
SK Slavia Prague players
LASK players
Czech First League players
Expatriate footballers in the Czech Republic
Ukrainian expatriate sportspeople in the Czech Republic
Expatriate footballers in Austria
Ukrainian expatriate sportspeople in Austria
Association football defenders
Ukraine under-21 international footballers